Michael David Martin Jr. (born February 19, 1973) is an American baseball coach and former catcher. He was most recently the head baseball coach at Florida State University. Martin played college baseball at Manatee Community College in 1992 and at Florida State University from 1993 to 1995 for coach Mike Martin and in Minor League Baseball (MiLB) for three seasons from 1995 to 1997.

Martin was born in Tallahassee, Florida. His father, Mike Martin Sr. was a center fielder for Florida State and a college coach at Florida State. He attended Maclay School in Tallahassee. After graduation from high school, he was selected by the Seattle Mariners in the 34th round of the 1991 Major League Baseball draft, but decided to attend Manatee Community College to play baseball. After his freshman year, he was recruited to play college baseball at Florida State. After his junior year, he was once again selected by the Mariners, this time in the 1994 Major League Baseball draft's 17th round. In the summer of 1994, he played collegiate summer baseball with the Orleans Cardinals of the Cape Cod Baseball League. Martin returned to Florida State for his senior season where he was drafted in the ninth round of the 1995 Major League Baseball draft by the San Diego Padres.

In 2019, Martin was named the head coach of the Florida State Seminoles baseball program, succeeding his father.

Martin was fired from his position of head coach on June 10, 2022.

See also
 List of current NCAA Division I baseball coaches

References

External links

Florida State Seminoles profile

1973 births
Living people
Florida State Seminoles baseball coaches
Florida State Seminoles baseball players
Clinton LumberKings players
Lancaster JetHawks players
Orleans Firebirds players
People from Tallahassee, Florida
Baseball coaches from Florida
SCF Manatees baseball players